Requiem For A Wren is a novel by Nevil Shute. It was first published in 1955 by William Heinemann Ltd. It was published in the United States under the title The Breaking Wave.

Plot summary
The late 1940s story concerns two English women, Wrens, and two Australian brothers. It is narrated by one of the brothers, Alan Duncan. His elder brother, Bill, a Royal Marine frogman, has been killed in action, and Alan is now returning to his wealthy parents' prosperous sheep station (ranch) in Australia. Alan has studied as a Rhodes Scholar at Oxford University and fought as a RAF pilot in World War II before being injured in action, losing both feet when his plane crashed. He has recently qualified as a barrister (called to the bar) in England.  

His arrival home is marred by the apparent suicide, a few hours earlier, of a young Englishwoman named Jessie Proctor, who was his parents' housekeeper. 

Alan guesses that this troubled woman must have left personal papers hidden somewhere in case her suicide attempt was not successful. He searches the house and finds a small suitcase of letters, diaries, and her passport. He is appalled to learn that he knew her: she was, in fact, Janet Prentice, a  former Wren and his late brother Bill's sweetheart. Together with another Wren, Viola Dawson, Alan has spent years searching for Janet after Bill's death.

Janet had a "lovely war" in Southern England, until tragic events around D-Day. In quick succession she lost Bill, then her father, and then her beloved dog. Her mother also died, shortly after the war. In addition, she believes herself responsible for the deaths of seven men, possibly allies, who were escaping in a German aeroplane which she may have shot down.

Reading through Janet's diaries, Alan learns that she came to Australia to find Bill's family, and that she still feels she must atone for the deaths of the seven men. He realizes that, after Bill's death, he and Janet, though never meeting, came to love each other, and ought to be the master and mistress of the family property; but now, the ghosts of Bill and Janet make it impossible for him to stay. But then he learns, as if from the ghosts, that he should "do the job for them"; and there is a woman in England, Viola, the other former Wren, who he should marry.

Notes and references

External links
 

1955 British novels
Novels by Nevil Shute
Heinemann (publisher) books
1955 Australian novels
Novels set in Victoria (Australia)
Women in the Royal Navy